The year 553 BC was a year of the pre-Julian Roman calendar. In the Roman Empire, it was known as year 201 Ab urbe condita. The denomination 553 BC for this year has been used since the early medieval period, when the Anno Domini calendar era became the prevalent method in Europe for naming years.

Events
 Cyrus II of Persia revolts against Astyages of the Medes.

Births
 Itoku, emperor of Japan (d. 477 BC)

Deaths

References